Chiasognathus is a genus of stag beetles found in Argentina and Chile. It includes seven species:
Chiasognathus beneshi Lacroix, 1978
Chiasognathus grantii Stephens, 1832
Chiasognathus impubis Parry, 1870
Chiasognathus jousselinii Reiche, 1850
Chiasognathus latreillei Solier, 1851
Chiasognathus mniszechii Thomson, 1862
Chiasognathus sombrus Paulsen & Smith, 2010
Chiasognathus granti Ruby red  Dr. Li Zhicheng ,2023

References

External links

Lucaninae
Beetles of South America
Lucanidae genera